John George Mellus (June 16, 1917 – November 28, 2005) was an American football player who played professional football as an offensive tackle for eight seasons in the National Football League and in the AAFC.

Career

Mellus was born in 1917 at Plymouth, Pennsylvania, the grandson of Lithuanian immigrants, and graduated in 1934 from Hanover High School at Hanover Township, Luzerne County, Pennsylvania.

Mellus attended Villanova University from 1934 to 1937, where he played football. In 1937 he was named to the New York Sun's collegiate All-America team (first-team) and to the Associated Press's 13th annual collegiate All-America team (second-team).

In 1938, Mellus played for the New York Giants on their championship team, and on their teams of 1939–1941. In December 1941, he was named to the first-team of the Associated Press's NFL All-Star team. After being drafted into military service in February 1942, Mellus played for the Eastern Army All-Star Team. In December 1943, he was named to the Associated Press's military service All American team.

Following his discharge from the military, Mellus played in 1946 for the San Francisco 49ers and from 1947 to 1949 for the Baltimore Colts. He was inducted into the Luzerne County Sports Hall of Fame in 1988, and into the Villanova University "Wall of Fame" in 2002.

John Mellus died at Dallas, Pennsylvania in 2005.

References

External links

1917 births
2005 deaths
People from Plymouth, Pennsylvania
Players of American football from Pennsylvania
American football tackles
Villanova Wildcats football players
New York Giants players
San Francisco 49ers (AAFC) players
Baltimore Colts (1947–1950) players
United States Army personnel of World War II
San Francisco 49ers players